The 1946 Liège–Bastogne–Liège was the 32nd edition of the Liège–Bastogne–Liège cycle race and was held on 5 May 1946. The race started and finished in Liège. The race was won by Prosper Depredomme.

General classification

References

1946
1946 in Belgian sport